Todd Taylor (born May 21, 1966) is the Iowa State Senator from the 40th District. A Democrat, he has served in the Iowa Senate since 2019. Previously between 1995 and 2019 he had served in the Iowa House of Representatives from the 70th District. He received his BA from Graceland College and his BS from the University of Northern Iowa.

, Taylor serves on several committees in the Iowa House - the Appropriations, Labor, and State Government committees.  He also serves as ranking member of the Justice System Appropriations Subcommittee and as a member of the Iowa Law Enforcement Academy Council and of the Statewide Fire and Police Retirement Board of Trustees.

Taylor was first elected in a June 27, 1995 special election, succeeding fellow Democrat Richard Running in the 54th District.

Electoral history
*incumbent

Voting record
In the 2017 legislative session, Taylor voted against a $638,000 cut to the Department of Veterans Affairs and Iowa Veterans Home.

References

 https://www.legis.iowa.gov/legislators/legislator?ga=86&personID=54

External links

 Representative Todd Taylor official Iowa General Assembly site
Todd Taylor State Representative official constituency site
 

1966 births
American members of the Community of Christ
Graceland University alumni
Living people
Democratic Party members of the Iowa House of Representatives
Politicians from Ames, Iowa
Politicians from Cedar Rapids, Iowa
University of Northern Iowa alumni
21st-century American politicians